In mathematics, more precisely in algebra, an étale group scheme is a certain kind of group scheme.

Definition 

References
 

Algebraic groups
Scheme theory